Kombanad  is a village in Ernakulam district in the Indian state of Kerala.

Tourism
Paniyely poru, the famous waterfalls and picnic spot is just 5 km away from Kombanad. Panamkuzhy river and mahogany plantation, another picnic spot, is also just 4 km away from Kombanad.haritha bio park. The famous Kodanad elephant training centre and mini zoo is also just 15 minutes drive from Kombanad.

Economy
Kombanad is a small junction with all facilities including banks, hospitals, educational institutions, government offices, temples, churches, etc. Most of the peoples belongs to farmers and the land is filled with rubber, coconut, arecanut, plantain, pineapple and rice paddy fields.

Kunnathnadu Tehsil
This village is part of Kunnathnadu taluk of Ernakulam district.  Other towns in this area include Kizhakkambalam, Kombanad, Mazhuvannoor, Rayamangalam and thiruvaniyoor.

Demographics 

According to the 2011 census of India, Kombanad has 2810 households. The literacy rate of the village is 84.96%.

References

Villages in Kunnathunad taluk